Mykolaiv is a city and shipbuilding port in southern Ukraine, in the eponymous raion and oblast

Mykolaiv or Mykolayiv can also refer to:

Places
 Mykolaiv Raion, Mykolaiv Oblast, Ukraine; containing the eponymous city
 Mykolaiv Oblast, Ukraine; containing the eponymous raion and city
Mykolaiv, Lviv Oblast, a small city (town) in western Ukraine, administrative center of the Mykolaiv Raion in the Lviv Oblast
 Mykolaiv Raion, Lviv Oblast, Ukraine; a former raion district
, a village in the Lviv Oblast of western Ukraine
, a village in the Lviv Oblast of western Ukraine
, a village in the Khmelnytskyi Oblast of western Ukraine
 Vitovka Raion, Ukraine; formerly known as Mykolaiv Raion (1939-1944)

Facilities and structures
 Mykolaiv Airport, Mykolaiv, Mykolaiv Raion, Mykolaiv Oblast, Ukraine
 Mykolaiv Observatory, Mykolaiv, Mykolaiv Raion, Mykolaiv Oblast, Ukraine; an astronomical observatory

Sports
 MBC Mykolaiv, a basketball team in Mykolaiv, Mykolaiv Raion, Mykolaiv Oblast, Ukraine
 MFC Mykolaiv, a soccer team in Mykolaiv, Mykolaiv Raion, Mykolaiv Oblast, Ukraine
MFC Mykolaiv-2, a soccer team in Mykolaiv, Mykolaiv, Mykolaiv, Ukraine
 FC Mykolaiv, a soccer team in Mykolaiv, Stryi Raion, Lvivska Oblast, Ukraine

Other uses
 Battle of Mykolaiv (2022), during the Russian invasion of Ukraine
 , a former Soviet and then Ukrainian Navy guard ship
 Mykolaiv Regional Committee of the Communist Party of Ukraine, USSR

See also

Mykolaiv Raion (disambiguation)
Mykolaiv Shipyard (disambiguation)
Mykolaiv offensive (2022), during the Russian invasion of Ukraine
Mykolayiv State Agrarian University, Mykolaiv, Mykolaiv, Mykolaiv, Ukraine
 
 
Mikołajów (disambiguation)
Nikolayev (disambiguation)